Bonaventura of Iseo (died c. 1273) was an Italian Friar Minor, diplomat, theologist and alchemist.

He played an important role for the Franciscan Order (Ordo Fratrum Minorum) as fiduciary of Elias of Cortona and later of Crescentius of Jesi, whose he was Vicar around the First Council of Lyon in 1245.

Friend of Albertus Magnus and of Thomas Aquinas, he was Franciscan Minister Provincial, in particular in the March of Treviso under Ezzelini.

Bonaventura of Iseo has traditionally been seen as the author of Liber compostille, an alchemical technical textbook. His work illustrates the spread of alchemia in the Italian Franciscan Order.

References

Italian Friars Minor
13th-century Italian Roman Catholic priests
1273 deaths
Year of birth unknown